"Ungodly Hour" is a song by American R&B duo Chloe x Halle for their second studio album of the same name. The song's music video was released on February 25, 2021 after its premiere on The Tonight Show Starring Jimmy Fallon. The song was written by the duo alongside English band Disclosure, who also handled production.

Upon the release of its parent album, "Ungodly Hour" received attention from music critics, who complimented its "sugar-coated melodies over a blissful Disclosure groove" or called it "a moment of vulnerability".

Background
Speaking with PopSugar in January 2020, the duo elaborated on the collaboration and how their session with Disclosure sparked the song's title: "[Disclosure] are two brothers, and they're literally like mirrors of [Chloe x Halle]. [Ungodly Hour] was a phrase for that [studio session] riff. We kind of spoke it into existence, you could say." The interview also revealed an alternate title idea from the session was "The Trouble With Angels".

Chloe Bailey said about the song's development:

Accolades

Live performances
The duo debuted "Ungodly Hour" live at the MTV Video Music Awards pre-show on Sunday, August 30, 2020. It was also performed at BBC's annual 1Xtra Live event in October 2020, and at Pepsi's Unmute Your Voice concert to encourage voting during the 2020 presidential election. On November 15, they performed the track once again at the 46th People's Choice Awards. The song was also part of their first Tiny Desk (Home) Concert uploaded on December 8, 2020.

Credits and personnel 
Credits adapted from Tidal.

 Chloe Bailey – lead vocals, songwriting, recording
 Halle Bailey – lead vocals, songwriting, engineering
 Guy Lawrence - songwriting, production, recording
 Howard Lawrence - songwriting, production
 Miles Comaskey - engineering
 Tony Maserati - mixing
 Dale Becker - mastering

Charts

References 

2020 songs
Chloe x Halle songs
Songs written by Chloe Bailey
Songs written by Halle Bailey
Songs written by Guy Lawrence
Songs written by Howard Lawrence